Eva Ďurišinová, married, Križková, (born 20 March 1961) is a Slovak former competitive figure skater. She represented Czechoslovakia at the 1976 Winter Olympics in Innsbruck, finishing 19th. She was coached by Hilda Múdra in Bratislava. She later became a coach as well, working with Alexandra Kunová.

Competitive highlights

References 

1961 births
Czechoslovak female single skaters
Slovak female single skaters
Living people
Figure skaters from Bratislava
Olympic figure skaters of Czechoslovakia
Figure skaters at the 1976 Winter Olympics